Farmer's Daughter is the debut album of American Idol season nine runner-up Crystal Bowersox. It was released on December 14, 2010, through Jive Records.

Background
After placing second on Idol, Crystal was signed to a deal with Jive Records and RCA's former sister record company 19 Recordings. Originally, Crystal wanted to delay the release of the album until early 2011, but ended up moving the release date to December 14. She is also to cover the Buffalo Springfield song "For What It's Worth," stating "its lyrics are relevant no matter what era it is, whatever war we're in and issues in the world," she said. "The song is always relevant." It was revealed that Chad Szeliga, who is well known for his drumming for bands such as Breaking Benjamin and OurAfter, has contributed drum tracks to the songs "Arlene", "Finally Got It Right" and "Hold On" which was written by Nickelback's Chad Kroeger.

The song "Holy Toledo" was played during Idol when she returned home. This is the first time an Idol contestant's own song was played during the show before their departure.

Singles
"Farmer's Daughter" was released as the first single on December 13, 2010. "Hold On" was supposed to be the first single, but was switched to "Farmer's Daughter." The music video for "Farmer's Daughter" premiered on her website on December 16, 2010.

Reception

Critical reception
The album received mixed to positive reviews. Allmusic gave the album 2.5 stars out of 5. Joey Guerra of the Houston Chronicle said the album "failed to live up to Idol hype." Metacritic gave the album 63 out of 100 based on six critical reviews.

Commercial success
In the United States, the album debuted at number 28 on the Billboard 200 chart, selling 58,000 copies and as of October 2011 has sold 205,000 copies.

In Canada, the album debuted at number 90 on the Canadian Albums Chart.

Track listing

Personnel
As noted at AllMusic:
Crystal Bowersox: Vocals, acoustic guitar
David Bendeth, Tommy Byrnes, David Ryan Harris, Nick Moroch: Guitars
John Widgren: Dobro, pedal steel
Jeff Kazee: Acoustic and electric piano, organ, keyboards, accordion
Zac Rae: Keyboards
Geoff Rockwell: Keyboards, programming
Ryan Syzyka: Harmonica
Sean Hurley, Frankie May, Greg Smith: Bass
Chuck Burgi, Dorian Crozier, Dan Korneff: Drums
Chad Szeliga: Drums, percussion
Memo Acevedo: Percussion

Charts

Weekly charts

Year-end charts

Sales

References

2010 debut albums
Crystal Bowersox albums
19 Recordings albums
Jive Records albums
Albums produced by David Bendeth